The 2022 South and Central American Women's Youth Handball Championship was the first edition of the tournament, took place in Taubaté, Brazil, from 26 to 30 April 2022. It acted as the South and Central American qualifying tournament for the 2022 Women's Youth World Handball Championship.

Standings

Results
All times are local (UTC–3).

Team champion roster

References

South and Central American Youth
South and Central American Women's Youth Handball Championship
International handball competitions hosted by Brazil
Sport in São Paulo (state)
South and Central American Women's Youth Handball Championship